Robert Coe may refer to:

 Robert Coe (colonist) (1596–1689), English colonist and early settler of Long Island
 Robert Douglas Coe (1902–1985), career diplomat and the U.S. ambassador to Denmark from 1953 to 1957
 Robert Glen Coe (1956–2000), American executed for a 1979 rape and murder